The Kent Film Office is a Kent County Council initiative which was set up in 2006 to promote filming in Kent and attract inward investment into the Kent economy from the film and broadcast industries.

Based in Invicta House, County Hall, Maidstone, the Kent Film Office has two staff members who provide a dedicated Film Commissioning Service including a location finding and research service, obtaining film permits, facilitating traffic management requests, sourcing local crew and trainees and mediating any disputes.

The Kent Film Office has the following three priorities for the county of Kent:
 Maximise inward investment from film and television productions
 Safeguard the civil rights and interests of Kent’s residents and businesses
 Support local sector infrastructure

Productions filmed in Kent 
Since its launch, filming activity has brought over £40 million into Kent, with the Kent Film Office assisting many high profile productions including:

Feature films:
 Avengers: Age of Ultron (2015) Marvel Studios filmed at Dover Castle 
 Into The Woods (2015) Walt Disney Pictures filmed at Dover Castle
 Rush (2013) Cross Creek Pictures, Exclusive Media, Working Title Films, Imagine Entertainment, Revolution Films   filmed at Brand's Hatch
 World War Z (2013) Skydance Productions, GK Films, Plan B Entertainment filmed at Discovery Park
 Great Expectations (2012 film) BBC Films  filmed at Stangate Creek, The Historic Dockyard Chatham, Shellness Beach and Swale nature reserve, Oare Marshes and St Thomas A Beckett church in Fairfield
 Sherlock Holmes 2: A Game of Shadows (2011) Silver Pictures, Village Roadshow Pictures filmed at Fort Amherst,  Knole, The White Cliffs of Dover and The Historic Dockyard Chatham
 My Week With Marilyn (2011) The Weinstein Company, BBC Films filmed at Saltwood Castle 
 Pirates of the Caribbean - On Stranger Tides (2011) Walt Disney Pictures filmed at Knole 
 Harry Potter and the Deathly Hallows – Part 1 (2010) Heyday Films filmed at the Dartford Crossing
 Sherlock Holmes (2009) Hartswood Films, WGBH film at The Historic Dockyard Chatham
 Wild Child (2008) Studio Canal, Relativity Media, Working Title Films filmed at Cobham Hall
 The Other Boleyn Girl (2008 film) BBC Films, Relativity Media filmed at Dover Castle, Knole and Penshurst Place

TV Dramas:
 Wolf Hall (2015) Company Pictures filmed at Dover Castle and Penshurst Place
 Hetty Feather (2015) CBBC filmed at Cobham Hall
 The Great Fire (2014) filmed at Cobham Hall and Penshurst Place
 The Honourable Woman (2014) BBC Worldwide, SundanceTV	filmed at Romney Marsh
 The Tunnel (2013) Kudos Film and Television filmed at the Channel Tunnel, Folkestone including the harbour, Discovery Park, Connaught Barracks, Dover including the Port, Margate and Ramsgate
 Southcliffe (2013) Warp Films	filmed at Faversham, Oare Marshes, Whitstable, East Kent Railway, Grain Power station, Canterbury and Sittingbourne 
 Parade's End (2012) Mammoth Screen filmed at St Thomas A Beckett Church, Fairfield in Romney Marsh, Dungeness, St Mary’s Bay and Dorton House in Sevenoaks.
 Henry V - The Hollow Crown - No Surrender (2012) Neal Street Productions, NBCUniversal, WNET filmed at Squerryes Court and Penshurst Place
 True Love (2012) BBC filmed entirely in Thanet at Margate, Turner Contemporary, Westgate-On-Sea, Cliftonville, Pegwell Bay, Botany Bay and Broadstairs
 The Mystery of Edwin Drood (2012) BBC, Masterpiece filmed in Rochester City including the castle and Cathedral and Riverside Country Park 
 Great Expectations (2011/2012) BBC Productions, 	filmed at the St Thomas A Beckett Fairfield church
 Poirot - The Clocks (2009) London Weekend Television,  filmed at Dover Castle, Dover and  St Margaret's Bay
 Emma (2009) BBC  filmed at Chilham and Squerryes Court
 Oliver Twist (2007) BBC	filmed at The Historic Dockyard Chatham
 Cape Wrath (2007) Ecosse Films	filmed at Leybourne Lakes, Mote Park Leisure Centre, Whatman warehouse Rusthall, Kings Hill, Imperial College-Wye Campus

Partnerships
The Kent Film Office works closely with national partners Creative England and is a member of the Film Offices UK group.

Locally, the Kent Film Office collaborates with organisations including The Maidstone Studios and Screen South.

In 2008, the Kent Film Office worked with all of Kent’s county and district councils, Kent Police and private stakeholders to launch the Kent Filming Partnership, pledging Kent to be a Film Friendly County.

Kent Development Fund 2009 – 2012
In 2009, the Kent Film Office launched a £200,000 Development Fund to support film and television projects with script development and productions wishing to locate their filming in Kent.  The fund invested in productions including Strawberry Fields (2012) and Age of Heroes (2011) and closed in 2012.

Film Tourism
The Kent Film Office has an interactive Movie Map which details feature films and TV dramas filmed in Kent, dating as far back as 1940 film Contraband, which featured Ramsgate. The Kent Movie Map has over 200 productions which have filmed across nearly 300 locations.

The Kent Film Office also has themed trails including Austen, Bond, Darling Buds of May, Dickens and The Other Boleyn Girl, with a special Tudor Trail to be released in 2016.

References

Film organisations in the United Kingdom
Kent County Council